The Aberdare Urban District Council was established in 1894 and covered the parish of Aberdare. Its responsibilities included public health, sanitation, roads and public works generally.

There were five wards, namely Aberaman (also known as No. 5 Ward), Blaengwawr (also known as No. 4 Ward), Gadlys (also known as No. 2 Ward), Llwydcoed (also known as No. 1 Ward), and the Town Ward (also known as No. 3 Ward).  At this time, one member was elected from each ward on an annual basis.

An election was held in April 1900. It was preceded by the 1899 election and followed by the 1901 election. The term of office of members elected at the 1897 election came to an end and those elected were to serve until 1903.

(*) denotes sitting member

Results

Aberaman Ward

Blaengwawr Ward

Gadlys Ward

Llwydcoed Ward (two seats)
Two members were elected owing to the vacant seat following the death of Rees Hopkin Rhys.

Town Ward
Hodges died in 1902 before the completion of his term.

References

Bibliography
 
 
 

1900
1900 Welsh local elections